The Muslim Interscholastic Tournament (MIST) is a 3-day tournament held in several regions across the United States, Canada, and the United Kingdom. The tournament gives young Muslim high school students a chance to showcase their talents and creative abilities in various competitions, including non-religious competitions like short film, mobile app development and poetry to more Islam-centric competitions such as a religious knowledge test and memorization of the Quran.

Overview 
There are two levels of MIST competitions: regional (qualifiers) and national.

As of 2019, regional MIST tournaments either occur over a single weekend or are divided into three days over two weekends. For regional tournaments taking place over two weekends, Saturday and Sunday are reserved for competitions, and an awards ceremony takes place on the following Sunday. For regional tournaments taking place over a single weekend, competitions take place Saturday and Sunday while the awards ceremony takes place on the same Sunday.

Trophies and medals are given to the top three places of various competitions, qualifying them for the national tournament held in the summer.

The national MIST tournament, however, takes place over three consecutive days on Friday, Saturday, and Sunday. The awards ceremony takes place on the same Sunday evening. <https://www.getmistified.com/competitions></https://www.getmistified.com/competitions>

History 
MIST was founded by Shazia Siddiqi in 2002 at Houston, Texas and the non-profit has been completely run by volunteers ever since.

Competitions

Category I: Knowledge and Quran

 Knowledge Tests
 Quran Memorization

Category II: Arts

 2D Art
 3D Art
 Fashion Design
 Graphic Design
 Photography

Category III: Writing and Oratory

 Extemporaneous Essay
 Extemporaneous Speaking
 Original Oratory
 Poetry
 Prepared Essay
 Short Fiction
 Spoken Word

Category IV: Brackets

 Debate
 Math Olympics
 MIST Quiz Bowl
 Improv

Category V: Group Projects

 Business Venture
 Nasheed
 Humanitarian Service (formerly Community Service)
 Science Fair
 Short Film
 Social Media

Category VI: Sports

 Basketball

Participation

Regions 
Below is a list of regions that host their own regional tournaments and participate in the national tournament, listed alphabetically.

 Atlanta
 Boston
 Chicago
 Columbus
 Dallas
 Detroit
 Florida
 Houston
 Nashville
 New Jersey
 New York
NorCal 
 Philadelphia
 Richmond
 Seattle
 St. Louis
SoCal (Southern California)
 Toronto
 United Kingdom
 Washington D.C.

Board Members 

 Founder & Executive Director: Shazia Siddiqi
 Regional Directors
 Atlanta: Sameera Omar
 Berkeley: Zeerek Ahmed
 Boston: Sarah Fahmy
 Chicago: Tehreem Hussain
 Columbus: Fatimah Masood
 Detroit: Hassan Ahmed
 Houston: Zain Khan
 Irvine: Ameera Jafrey
 Nashville: Hala Zein-Sabatto
 New Jersey: Hiba Khan
 New York: Nazija Akter
 Orlando: Zaid Dabus
 Philadelphia: Tamim Hossain
 Richmond: Samah Mohamed
 St. Louis: Hamza Jalal
 Toronto: Nesa Huda
 Washington DC: Naeem Baig

Volunteers 
After graduating high school, people who still want to be a part of MIST can register as volunteers. Volunteers are needed for various tasks such as assisting judges and hosting keynote speakers.

Coaches 
Each team has a coach that must be 21 years or older to oversee all the high school students during the weekend and keep everything in check during registration.

Judges 
Every competition has judges who volunteer during the weekend of MIST to decide the recipients of first, second, and third place awards of each competition.

Notable participants 
Noor Tagouri, a Libyan American journalist and producer of documentary "The Trouble They’ve Seen: The Forest Haven Story" and "Sold in America", participated in MIST in high school and was a keynote speaker at multiple MIST tournaments including MIST Chicago in 2016.

Demographics 
Out of the MIST participants in 2007, 60% were South Asian, 20% Arab, 17% Black, and about 3% were of other races or ethnicities. Additionally, about 82% were estimated to be Sunni Muslims, 15% Shia Muslim, and 3% non-Muslim.

Preparation 
Preparation for regional MIST tournaments starts early November, when board members start planning, looking for sponsors, venue, and volunteers. They have weekly board meetings to keep up with progress. Registration for MIST regional tournaments begins in winter, high school students choose their competitions and start practicing, creating, and studying for their events. Regional MIST tournaments are usually held in late March or early April, while the national MIST competition can take place anytime from late July to early August.

National tournament 
The top 3 places in regional tournament for each competition qualifies for nationals. national tournaments take place in a different city each year.

National tournament locations 

 2011: Atlanta
 2012: Toronto
 2013: Detroit
 2014: Washington DC
 2015: Houston
 2016: Toronto
 2017: Detroit
 2018: New York
 2019: Baltimore
 2020: TBD
 2021: Online
 2022: Washington DC

References 

Islamic education